Ahane may refer to:

Ahane, County Kerry, a townland in County Kerry, Ireland
Ahane GAA, a Gaelic Athletic Association club in Limerick, Ireland
Ahane (surname), a surname of Ryukyuan origin

People with the surname
, Japanese singer-songwriter

Japanese-language surnames